The 2007 CFL season was the 54th season of modern-day Canadian football, the 50th season of the Canadian Football League, and many special events were held to commemorate the event. Regular-season play began on June 28, 2007 at the Rogers Centre in Toronto, Ontario and concluded on Saturday, November 3, 2007.  The playoffs began on Sunday, November 11, 2007, and ended with the championship game, the 95th Grey Cup, at the Rogers Centre in Toronto, on November 25, 2007, with the Saskatchewan Roughriders as champions.

CFL News in 2007

Schedule
On February 14, 2007, the CFL announced the game schedule for the 2007 season, introducing a 19-week schedule that included 18 regular-season games and one bye week for each team. Bye weeks were taken consecutively by each division beginning with the East in Week 8, creating two weeks of divisional rivalry games.

The year's regular-season schedule kicked off on Canada Day weekend and included the CFL's annual traditional rivalries — highlighted by the Labour Day and Thanksgiving Classics. The Canadian Football Hall of Fame game returned to Ivor Wynne Stadium on induction weekend and featured the Winnipeg Blue Bombers and the Hamilton Tiger-Cats on September 15.

The regular-season concluded with a triple-header on Saturday, November 3, as teams finalized post-season positioning before the Division Semi-Finals began eight days later on Sunday, November 11. The CFL's Division Championships qualified the season's two Grey Cup competing teams one week later on November 18. The 2007 season officially concluded with the 95th Grey Cup on Sunday, November 25, returning to Toronto for the first time since 1992.

Television
On February 28, 2007, the CFL announced details of the 2007 broadcast schedule which included all 77 games broadcast across the country by partners TSN, CBC or RDS.

The year's regular season schedule saw 50 games aired on TSN, which were also carried live on TSN Broadband, 22 games on CBC and a minimum of 16 Montreal Alouettes' games on RDS. Coverage of the entire post-season, including the 95th Grey Cup in Toronto, Ontario, returned to CBC and RDS in the fall.  The 2007 season would be the CBC's final season as a CFL broadcaster for the foreseeable future, as the CFL and TSN began an exclusive 5-year deal with the 2008 CFL season.

TSN's 50-game CFL broadcast schedule became available for the first time ever on multiple TSN distribution platforms. All 50 games aired live on TSN and TSN Broadband, with a minimum of 35 broadcasts produced and televised in High Definition on TSN HD. The majority of HD telecasts aired Friday nights during the 11th season of Wendy's Friday Night Football.

TSN's broadcast schedule got underway on June 28 with a season opening double-header featuring BC at Toronto followed by Winnipeg at Edmonton. Additional highlights included two Grey Cup rematches featuring Montreal vs. BC (Aug. 31 and Sept. 9), the traditional Labour Day Classic Weekend with Winnipeg at Saskatchewan (Sept. 2) and the Hall of Fame Game featuring Winnipeg at Hamilton (Sept. 15).

The first of 22 CFL on CBC regular-season games aired on Saturday, June 30 when the Hamilton Tiger-Cats played the Calgary Stampeders at McMahon Stadium. CBC's regular-season line-up featured the first-ever CFL on CBC triple-header as well as the traditional double-headers, the Labour Day and Thanksgiving Day Classics.

League Attendance
The CFL's average attendance for 2007 was 29,167, which is the highest average since the 1983 CFL season.

CFL in Ottawa
The Ottawa franchise did not play in the 2007 season.  The CFL indicated that there was not enough time for a potential new owner to get the franchise up and running until 2009 at the earliest.

Salary Management System
2007 was the first year the new salary cap and salary management system was enforced. The cap was set at $4.05 million and it demonstrated its successful implementation as six clubs were under the salary expenditure cap while two teams exceeded and were penalized.  The Saskatchewan Roughriders were fined, as were the Montreal Alouettes, who also lost a first round draft pick at the 2008 CFL Canadian Draft. selection.

New Commissioner
On March 12, 2007, Mark Cohon was named the CFL's 12th commissioner.  The son of McDonald's of Canada founder George Cohon succeeded Tom Wright.  Born in Chicago, Illinois, Cohon moved to Toronto, Ontario when he was two years old.  Cohon is a graduate of Chicago's Northwestern University with a Bachelor of Science with a major in communication studies and was a business consultant to environmental and youth organizations in Toronto before becoming president and chief executive officer of AudienceView Ticketing, a company which sells ticketing systems and services to sports, arts and entertainment events.  In 2006, he was appointed new chair of the Ontario Science Centre. He was appointed to the board of trustees in 2003.

Rule Changes

The "Ricky Williams Rule"
Outgoing CFL commissioner Tom Wright, stated that a rule will be introduced before the start of next season that would prevent a player under suspension in the National Football League from signing with a CFL club. Some columnists dubbed this "The Ricky Williams Rule" because the running back joined the Toronto Argonauts after the NFL suspended him for the 2006 season for failing its substance abuse program for the fourth time.

Illegal Movement
This rule will penalize offensive linemen 5 yards for abrupt snap down into 2 or 3 point stance.  This rule is aimed at eliminating a tactic by offensive linemen, solely designed to draw the defence offside.

Kick from Scrimmage
On a kick from scrimmage going out of bounds in flight between the 20-yard lines, the receiving team will have the option of taking possession at the point the ball went out of bounds in flight, or having a 10-yard penalty applied against the kicking team at the point of the last scrimmage, with the down repeated. This forces the kicking team on punts and field goal attempts to land the ball in the field of play.

Unnecessary roughness
Any player in possession of the ball, who falls to the ground without contact and is not attempting to advance the ball, may only be touched down and may not be contacted in any other manner. Players on the ground are in an extremely vulnerable position and should be protected from excessive contact.
Horse-collar tackles will be penalized.
Contact above the shoulders on the long snapper will be penalized.

Roughing the Passer
Contact below a quarterback's knees will no longer be accepted.
Defensive players may no longer lead with the head or use the head as the primary contact point to hit a passer. Ducking the head and launching at a passer is not acceptable. In the 2006 season, Spergon Wynn was the victim of such a hit at the hands of Scott Schultz. There was no penalty on the play, although Schultz was subsequently fined.

Blocking on Kick Returns
Players on the return team will once again be allowed to block oncoming tacklers from the sides. This was the rule until 2006, when the CFL outlawed blocks on the back of the side, leading to the temporary demise of the kick return touchdown. In 2006, there were only three touchdowns from kick returns, compared to eighteen in 2005. In addition to fewer touchdowns being scored, shorter kick returns lead to offences having to cover a larger portion of the field to score a touchdown, leading to more field goals and fewer touchdowns. With the long kick returns coming back in 2007, it was expected that games would be higher scoring and more exciting.

Records and Milestones

Winnipeg Blue Bombers slotback, Milt Stegall passed Mike Pringle and George Reed for the most career touchdowns with 137 on July 27. By the end of the season he had 144 career touchdowns and, with 14,695 career receiving yards, was trying to pass Allen Pitts all-time league record of 14,891 receiving yards.

Toronto Argonauts slotback, Derrell Mitchell surpassed Paul Masotti as the franchise's all-time leading receiver on July 26.

Winnipeg Blue Bombers running back, Charles Roberts passed Leo Lewis to become the franchise's all-time leading rusher on September 2.

BC running back, Joe Smith broke former Lion great Cory Philpot's franchise single season rushing record on October 28.

Regular season
Note: GP = Games Played, W = Wins, L = Losses, T = Ties, PF = Points For, PA = Points Against, Pts = Points

''Teams in bold finished in playoff positions.

Grey Cup Playoffs

The Saskatchewan Roughriders are the 2007 Grey Cup Champions, defeating the Winnipeg Blue Bombers 23–19 at Toronto's Rogers Centre. It was the first Grey Cup for the Roughriders since they won it in 1989, ending an 18-year drought. The Roughriders' James Johnson (DB) was named the Grey Cup's Most Valuable Player and Andy Fantuz (SB) was named as the Grey Cup's Most Valuable Canadian.

Playoff bracket

CFL Leaders
 CFL Passing Leaders
 CFL Rushing Leaders
 CFL Receiving Leaders

2007 CFL All-Stars

Offence
QB – Kerry Joseph, Saskatchewan Roughriders
WR – Derick Armstrong, Winnipeg Blue Bombers
WR – Jason Clermont, BC Lions
WR – Terrence Edwards, Winnipeg Blue Bombers
WR – Geroy Simon, BC Lions
RB – Charles Roberts, Winnipeg Blue Bombers
RB – Joe Smith, BC Lions
OT – Dan Goodspeed, Winnipeg Blue Bombers
OT – Rob Murphy, BC Lions
OG – Kelly Bates, BC Lions
OG – Scott Flory, Montreal Alouettes
C – Jeremy O'Day, Saskatchewan Roughriders

Defence
DE – Jonathan Brown, Toronto Argonauts
DE – Cameron Wake, BC Lions
DT – Doug Brown, Winnipeg Blue Bombers
DT – Tyrone Williams, BC Lions
LB – Kevin Eiben, Toronto Argonauts
LB – Zeke Moreno, Hamilton Tiger-Cats
LB – Barrin Simpson, Winnipeg Blue Bombers
DB – Ryan Phillips, BC Lions
DB – Kenny Wheaton, Toronto Argonauts
CB – Byron Parker, Toronto Argonauts
CB – Jordan Younger, Toronto Argonauts
DS – Orlondo Steinauer, Toronto Argonauts

Special teams
K – Nick Setta, Hamilton Tiger-Cats
P – Damon Duval, Montreal Alouettes
ST – Ian Smart, BC Lions

2007 Western All-Stars

Offence
QB – Kerry Joseph, Saskatchewan Roughriders
WR – Jason Clermont, BC Lions
WR – D.J. Flick, Saskatchewan Roughriders
WR – Nik Lewis, Calgary Stampeders
WR – Geroy Simon, BC Lions
RB – Joffrey Reynolds, Calgary Stampeders
RB – Joe Smith, BC Lions
OT – Gene Makowsky, Saskatchewan Roughriders
OT – Rob Murphy, BC Lions
OG – Kelly Bates, BC Lions
OG – Jay McNeil, Calgary Stampeders
C – Jeremy O'Day, Saskatchewan Roughriders

Defence
DE – Fred Perry, Saskatchewan Roughriders
DE – Cameron Wake, BC Lions
DT – Aaron Hunt, BC Lions
DT – Tyrone Williams, BC Lions
LB – Otis Floyd, BC Lions
LB – Reggie Hunt, Saskatchewan Roughriders
LB – Maurice Lloyd, Saskatchewan Roughriders
DB – Korey Banks, BC Lions
DB – Ryan Phillips, BC Lions
CB – Lavar Glover, BC Lions
CB – James Johnson, Saskatchewan Roughriders
DS – Barron Miles, BC Lions

Special teams
K – Sandro DeAngelis, Calgary Stampeders
P – Paul McCallum, BC Lions
ST – Ian Smart, BC Lions

2007 Eastern All-Stars

Offence
QB – Kevin Glenn, Winnipeg Blue Bombers
WR – Derick Armstrong, Winnipeg Blue Bombers
WR – Ben Cahoon, Montreal Alouettes
WR – Terrence Edwards, Winnipeg Blue Bombers
WR – Milt Stegall, Winnipeg Blue Bombers
RB – Jesse Lumsden, Hamilton Tiger-Cats
RB – Charles Roberts, Winnipeg Blue Bombers
OT – Alexandre Gauthier, Winnipeg Blue Bombers
OT – Dan Goodspeed, Winnipeg Blue Bombers
OG – Scott Flory, Montreal Alouettes
OG – Taylor Robertson, Toronto Argonauts
C – Marwan Hage, Hamilton Tiger-Cats

Defence
DE – Jonathan Brown, Toronto Argonauts
DE – Tom Canada, Winnipeg Blue Bombers
DT – Adriano Belli, Toronto Argonauts
DT – Doug Brown, Winnipeg Blue Bombers
LB – Kevin Eiben, Toronto Argonauts
LB – Zeke Moreno, Hamilton Tiger-Cats
LB – Barrin Simpson, Winnipeg Blue Bombers
DB – Randee Drew, Montreal Alouettes
DB – Kenny Wheaton, Toronto Argonauts
CB – Byron Parker, Toronto Argonauts
CB – Jordan Younger, Toronto Argonauts
DS – Orlondo Steinauer, Toronto Argonauts

Special teams
K – Nick Setta, Hamilton Tiger-Cats
P – Damon Duval, Montreal Alouettes
ST – Dominique Dorsey, Toronto Argonauts

2007 Intergold CFLPA All-Stars

Offence
QB – Kevin Glenn, Winnipeg Blue Bombers
OT – Dan Goodspeed, Winnipeg Blue Bombers
OT – Patrick Kabongo, Edmonton Eskimos
OG – Andrew Greene, Winnipeg Blue Bombers
OG – Scott Flory, Montreal Alouettes
C – Marwan Hage, Hamilton Tiger-Cats
RB – Charles Roberts, Winnipeg Blue Bombers
FB – Chris Szarka, Saskatchewan Roughriders
SB – Terrence Edwards, Winnipeg Blue Bombers
SB – Milt Stegall, Winnipeg Blue Bombers
WR – Derick Armstrong, Winnipeg Blue Bombers
WR – Kamau Peterson, Edmonton Eskimos

Defence
DE – Jonathan Brown, Toronto Argonauts
DE – Cameron Wake, BC Lions
DT – Doug Brown, Winnipeg Blue Bombers
DT – Adriano Belli, Toronto Argonauts
LB – Barrin Simpson, Winnipeg Blue Bombers
LB – Zeke Moreno, Hamilton Tiger-Cats
LB – JoJuan Armour, Hamilton Tiger-Cats
CB – Byron Parker, Toronto Argonauts
CB – Jordan Younger, Toronto Argonauts
HB – Korey Banks, BC Lions
HB – Ryan Phillips, BC Lions
S – Barron Miles, BC Lions

Special teams
K – Nick Setta, Hamilton Tiger-Cats
ST – Dominique Dorsey, Toronto Argonauts
P – Damon Duval, Montreal Alouettes

Head coach
 Kent Austin, Saskatchewan Roughriders

2007 Rogers CFL Awards
CFL's Most Outstanding Player Award – Kerry Joseph (QB), Saskatchewan Roughriders
CFL's Most Outstanding Canadian Award – Jason Clermont (SB), BC Lions
CFL's Most Outstanding Defensive Player Award – Cameron Wake (DE), BC Lions
CFL's Most Outstanding Offensive Lineman Award – Rob Murphy (OG), BC Lions
CFL's Most Outstanding Rookie Award – Cameron Wake (DE), BC Lions
CFL's Most Outstanding Special Teams Award – Ian Smart (RB), BC Lions
CFLPA's Outstanding Community Service Award – Milt Stegall (SB), Winnipeg Blue Bombers
Rogers Fans' Choice Award – Charles Roberts (RB), Winnipeg Blue Bombers
CFL's Scotiabank Coach of the Year – Kent Austin, Saskatchewan Roughriders
Commissioner's Award – Keith Pelley, Toronto 
Hugh Campbell Distinguished Leadership Award - Bob Ackles, BC Lions

References

Cfl Season, 2007
Canadian Football League seasons